Aaron Augenblick (born December 28, 1975) is an American animator, director, and producer. He is the founder of Augenblick Studios, known for his work on Ugly Americans, Superjail!, Wonder Showzen, and Golden Age.

Early life and education
Augenblick grew up in Wilmington, Delaware, and studied at the School of Visual Arts (SVA) in New York City. While at college, Augenblick created two animated short films entitled "The Midnight Carnival" (screened at Slamdance Festival 2000) and "The Wire". These films received two ASIFA Awards and the SVA  Dusty Award for outstanding achievement in Animation. On October 20, 1996, "The Wire" was screened on the Cartoon Network as part of the ToonHeads special: A Night of Independent Animation.

Career
He began his professional career working at MTV Animation on such television shows as Daria, Cartoon Sushi and Downtown.  In 1999, Augenblick founded Augenblick Studios, an animation production facility located in Brooklyn, NY. In addition to animation, Augenblick has written and illustrated the Xeric Award-winning "Tales of the Great Unspoken".

From 2004 to 2005, Augenblick was the animation director for two seasons of Wonder Showzen, a cult favorite for MTV. Augenblick Studios garnered widespread notoriety for their spot-on parodies of classic cartoons, leading to Augenblick being named as one of the rising stars of animation by Animation Magazine.

In 2006, Augenblick wrote and directed Golden Age, a faux-documentary which examined the scandalous private lives of iconic cartoon characters from the past. The ten episodes series was originally created for Comedy Central's broadband channel Motherload and was later released as a 22-minute short film. Golden Age was an official selection of the Sundance Film Festival and played in numerous festivals throughout the world.

Augenblick Studios created the first season of Superjail! in 2008, an animated series for Adult Swim on the Cartoon Network. Augenblick was the show's executive producer and animation director.

From 2010 to 2012, Augenblick served as the supervising producer and animation director for Comedy Central's horror-comedy series Ugly Americans. The 2011 Ottawa International Animation Festival screened a retrospective of Augenblick's work. In 2015, he directed animated shows "Golan the Insatiable" for Fox and "The Jellies" for Golf Wang. Augenblick served as an executive producer and director for Adult Swim's adaptation of The Jellies in 2017.

References

External links 
 Augenblick Studios official web site
 
 Augenblick Studios article on AWN
 Aaron Augenblick interview on The Reeler
 Aaron Augenblick interview on Cartoon Brew
 God v. Devil v. ‘Drunky’ In New R-Rated Animated Feature

Living people
Animators from New York (state)
American comics artists
American animated film directors
American animated film producers
American television directors
American television producers
People from Brooklyn
Artists from Wilmington, Delaware
School of Visual Arts alumni
1975 births